Den of Lions (Hungarian title: Oroszlánbarlang) is a 2003 film directed and written by James Bruce and produced by Daphne Lerner and Váradi Gábor. It is a violent direct-to-video B movie, starring relatively famous actors like Stephen Dorff, Bob Hoskins and more.

Plot
Mike Varga (Stephen Dorff) is an FBI agent with Hungarian roots and a gypsy origin. For a new investigation, he is sent to Budapest to infiltrate the Russian mafia, get close to the brutal mafia boss Darius Paskevic (Bob Hoskins), and end his series of crimes. However, Varga gets into trouble when he falls in love with Paskevic's daughter (Laura Fraser).

Cast
 Stephen Dorff as FBI Agent Mike Varga
 Bob Hoskins as Darius Paskevic
 Laura Fraser as Katya Paskevic
 Ian Hart as FBI Agent Rob Shepard
 David O'Hara as Ferko Kurchina
 József Gyabronka as MTI Agent Laszlo Juskus
 Andrew McCulloch as MTI Agent Gyurka Kovacs
 Tania Emery as Rita
 Philip Madoc as Grandpa Marcus Varga
 Athina Papadimitriu as Aunt Bardi Varga
 Zita Görög as Nico (as Zita Gorog)
 Attila Szatmari as Tomasz Nazarov
 Sarah Ann Schultz as Anna Nazarova
 Nabil Massad as Haznl
 Robert Wilcox as Yakov
 Billie Kaman as Gabi
 Mike Kelly as Simon
 Akos Horvath as Rita's Husband
 Mark Urban as Rita's Son

External links

2003 films
English-language Hungarian films
2000s English-language films